West Budd Island is the western of two larger islands at the north end of the Flat Islands, Holme Bay. Mapped by Norwegian cartographers from air photos taken by the Lars Christensen Expedition, 1936–37. They named the northern islands Flatøynalane (the flat island needles). This western island was named by ANCA for Dr. G.M. Budd, medical officer at nearby Mawson Station in 1959.

See also 
 Composite Antarctic Gazetteer
 List of Antarctic islands south of 60° S
 SCAR
 Territorial claims in Antarctica

References

Islands of Mac. Robertson Land